, provisional designation , is an asteroid on an eccentric orbit, classified as near-Earth object and potentially hazardous asteroid of the Apollo group, approximately 2.5 kilometers in diameter. It was discovered on 13 November 2002, by astronomers of the Near-Earth Asteroid Tracking program at Palomar Observatory in California, United States. It is one of the largest potentially hazardous asteroids known.

Orbit and classification 

 is a member of the dynamical Apollo group, which are Earth-crossing asteroids. Apollo asteroids are the largest subgroup of near-Earth objects. It orbits the Sun at a distance of 0.9–3.4 AU once every 3 years and 1 month (1,138 days; semi-major axis of 2.13 AU). Its orbit has an eccentricity of 0.58 and an inclination of 9° with respect to the ecliptic.

The body's observation arc begins with a precovery from the Digitized Sky Survey taken at the Palomar Observatory in October 1955, or 47 years prior to its official discovery observation.

Close approaches 

With an absolute magnitude of 15.3,  is one of the brightest and largest known potentially hazardous asteroid (see PHA-list). On 18 May 2092, the body will make its closest near-Earth encounter at a nominal distance of 0.095 AU (37 LD). The asteroid is also Mars-crosser, crossing the orbit of the Red Planet at 1.66 AU.

Physical characteristics 

 is an assumed, stony S-type asteroid.

Rotation period 

Lightcurve analysis gave a consolidated rotation period of 7.879 hours with a brightness amplitude between 0.31 and 0.64 magnitude.

In 2017, Warner also modeled the photometric data and determined a sidereal period of 7.878512 hours, as well as a spin axis of (73.0°, −50.0°) in ecliptic coordinates (λ, β).

Diameter and albedo 

According to the survey carried out by the NEOWISE mission of NASA's Wide-field Infrared Survey Explorer,  measures 2.233 kilometers in diameter and its surface has an albedo of 0.294, while the Collaborative Asteroid Lightcurve Link assumes a standard albedo for stony asteroids of 0.20, and calculates a diameter of 2.59 kilometers based on an absolute magnitude of 15.3.

Numbering and naming 

This minor planet was numbered by the Minor Planet Center on 30 August 2004. As of 2018, it has not been named.

Notes

References

External links 
 Asteroid Lightcurve Database (LCDB), query form (info )
 Dictionary of Minor Planet Names, Google books
 Asteroids and comets rotation curves, CdR – Observatoire de Genève, Raoul Behrend
 
 
 

090075
090075
090075
20021113